Coleen Patricia Nolan (born 12 March 1965) is an English singer, television personality, and author. She was a member of the girl group The Nolans from 1980 to 1994, in which she sang with her sisters. Since 2000, Nolan has been a regular panellist on the ITV talk show Loose Women.

From 2001 to 2002, Nolan co-presented the ITV daytime show This Morning and later returned to the show from 2010 to 2012 as a presenter of the interactive hub segments. In 2009, she competed in the fourth series of the ITV show Dancing on Ice, in which she finished in fourth place. In 2012, Nolan appeared in the tenth series of the Channel 5 reality series Celebrity Big Brother, finishing as runner-up. She returned to Celebrity Big Brother in 2017 and won the nineteenth series.

Early life 
Coleen Patricia Nolan was born 12 March 1965 in Blackpool, England, to Irish parents. She is the youngest of eight children and the only one born in England.

Career
On 5 February 1974, Nolan made her first television appearance with her sisters when she was almost nine years old, as The Nolans appeared on the It's Cliff Richard! television series. With the line-up featuring all six sisters and billed as The Nolan Sisters, they performed "Stuck on You". That same year they released their debut single, "But I Do", with Nolan singing lead vocals. Owing to her age, Nolan would not become a full-time member of the group until 1980, when she was fifteen, although she does appear in the music video to their 1979 hit "I'm In the Mood for Dancing", which reached number three in the UK singles chart. The group had further UK top twenty hits with "Don't Make Waves" (1980), "Gotta Pull Myself Together" (1980), "Who's Gonna Rock You" (1981), "Attention to Me" (1981), "Chemistry" (1981) and "Don't Love Me Too Hard" (1982). In 1981, they won the Tokyo Music Festival with the song "Sexy Music".

On 14 January 1987, Nolan appeared alongside her sisters Anne, Bernie and Maureen in the BBC sitcom Filthy Rich & Catflap. In 1991, the group won a 33rd Japan Record Awards Kikaku-shō (Prize for Planning) for Cover version of Japanese pops. Nolan left the group in 1994 to concentrate on raising a family, although she did return briefly in 1995 to promote a re-recorded version of "I'm in the Mood for Dancing".

In 2000, Nolan became a regular panellist on ITV's  Loose Women. She has been with the series on and off for the last 20 years. She left Loose Women on 28 July 2011 only to return again on 7 October 2013 as a regular panellist. Since July 2014 Nolan has also been a relief anchor of the show.

Nolan presented the programme, The Truth About... Eternal Youth about plastic surgery on ITV in 2009, and presented The Secret Guide To Women's Health in 2010 on Sky Real Lives.

In 2000, Nolan played the part of Janelle Cooper in the short comedy film, Rattler.

Beginning on 11 January 2009 Nolan took part in the fourth series of Dancing on Ice on ITV. Of her appearance on the show Nolan said, "I've never really skated. When I was 14 I used to go to Disco Beat in Blackpool with my friend. We'd skate round once, hanging on to each other, and spend the rest of the night posing, like 14-year-old girls do. I could only go forwards, I couldn't stop!" She was eliminated in week 10, finishing in fourth place. She went on to co-host the spin-off show Dancing on Ice Friday with Ben Shephard in 2010. and on 27 February 2011, she hosted Dancing on Ice, in place of Holly Willoughby who fell ill.

On 15 August 2012, Nolan was announced as the eleventh celebrity to enter the Celebrity Big Brother house on Channel 5.

In 2013, Nolan was a resident agony aunt on the ITV chat show The Alan Titchmarsh Show, appearing on the show every Friday. In 2015 she took part in ITV's Give a Pet a Home series which worked alongside the RSPCA in Birmingham. The show began airing in April 2015, with Amanda Holden as host.

In 2017, Nolan participated in Celebrity Big Brother again. In the house she struck up a friendship with Game of Thrones actor James Cosmo. On day 18 she was put up for eviction by Jamie O'Hara during a nominations twist in the superheroes shopping task. On day 19 it was revealed that Nolan received the most votes out of her, Chloe Ferry, Kim Woodburn and Jedward in a live flash vote. Also on day 19, she voted for Cosmo to gain eternal immunity which he eventually won after the most housemates voted for him. On Day 32 (3 February), she was announced as the winner of Celebrity Big Brother 19.

On 3 September 2018, Nolan announced that she would embark on her first solo concert tour, the Never Too Late Tour, in 2019. Originally scheduled to begin on 11 January, the tour was postponed indefinitely on 6 September 2018.

Guest appearances
On 4 March 2002, Nolan was a panellist on BBC panel game show Never Mind the Buzzcocks. On 25 May she appeared on An Audience with Brian Conley. Later in 2002, she took part in the first series of the reality television programme Celebrity Fit Club, which followed overweight celebrities as they tried to lose weight for charity.

On 7 January 2003, Nolan appeared in the documentary We Are Family that chronicled the success stories of various musical acts that were made up of family members. In 2002 and 2003, she was a panellist on the chat show The Wright Stuff on Five and guest hosted the show herself in 2013.

On 3 June 2005, Nolan took part in the first series of the ITV daytime programme, Have I Been Here Before? presented by Phillip Schofield, which offered celebrity guests the chance to see if they have lived before, through past life regression. Nolan was said to have been a "nervous 16-year-old debutante".

In September 2006, Nolan returned to Celebrity Fit Club as part of the judging panel in the fourth series. On 6 October she was a guest on The Sharon Osbourne Show and, ten days later, was a guest on the Irish chat show, broadcast and produced by RTÉ, The Podge and Rodge Show.

On 19 September 2008, Nolan appeared on Al Murray's Happy Hour and on 27 September she appeared with her family on the third series of All Star Family Fortunes competing against Barry McGuigan and his family. She has also made guest appearances on Alan Carr's Celebrity Ding Dong (31 October) and The Paul O'Grady Show (18 December), both on Channel 4.

On 13 September 2012, she was a guest panellist on an episode of Celebrity Juice on ITV2.

On 15 February 2013, Nolan stood in for Matthew Wright as host of The Wright Stuff on Channel 5.

Other work
Nolan has a weekly column in Best magazine.

In 2007, Nolan featured in television advertisements for the supermarket chain Iceland, along with her sister Bernie and former Loose Women colleague Kerry Katona. She appeared in further commercials for Iceland during the next couple of years. She was also the new face of Park Christmas Savings and appeared in their television advertisements in December 2010.

In early 2008 she released a DVD, A Brand New You, produced with Rosemary Conley.

Nolan made her pantomime debut in 2013, playing the fairy godmother at the Manchester Opera House, and reprised the role in 2017 at the Bradford Alhambra.

Personal life
Nolan married Shane Richie in 1990, and they had two sons before splitting up in 1997 and divorcing in 1999.

She gave birth to a daughter, Ciara, on 19 June 2001 and became engaged to her longtime boyfriend Ray Fensome (a musician from Leeds) when he proposed on her 40th birthday in 2005. They married in November 2007. On 6 February 2018, Nolan announced that she and Fensome were getting divorced after two years of marital difficulties. The divorce was finalised in mid-December 2018, and Nolan said that she and Fensome have been able to remain friends with each other since the divorce. Coleen lives in Cheshire.

Her mother, Maureen, had Alzheimer's. In 2006 Nolan opened the first Alzheimer's Society information centre on the Fylde coast. Maureen died on 30 December 2007.

Controversies 
Nolan, at various times, has made controversial statements and shared opinions which some have deemed offensive.

In 2005, on Loose Women, she said that if her 16-year-old son passed his exams, she would pay for him to go on a sex trip to Amsterdam and that she had given her fiancé Ray Fensome permission to have a one-night stand during the proposed trip. She gained criticism from Shane Richie, who said he was "disgusted and appalled" by her comments about their son, and that he hoped and assumed "it was said in total jest." However, Nolan defended her comments with assumption, saying that she had told her son that she would pay for a long weekend for him anywhere in the world and that he had mentioned how he and his mates had always wanted to go to Amsterdam to see the red light district. If he planned to go on a trip to Ibiza everybody would have thought that was fine, even though he would probably have unprotected sex with lots of girls. In the News of the World newspaper she said, "In an ideal world I'd never condone my son sleeping with hookers, but it's a fact of life that boys of his age have casual sex. So if I'm pushed, I'd rather he does it somewhere well-policed and where the girls have health checks than behind the wall of a club in Ibiza with absolutely no safeguards." In relation to her giving Ray Fensome permission to have a one-night stand, she said: "In all honesty, I couldn't care less [if he does]. What bothers me more is the thought of Ray going into a bar, chatting up a really stunning girl, having sex with her, spending the night and waking up with her the next morning. I couldn't cope with that."

In January 2007, during a debate on Loose Women about gay adoption, Nolan said that gay people should not be allowed to adopt children, followed by her opinion that "there's only so much I want to accept".

In May 2015, she compared gay rights with supporting ISIS and said that bakery owners should be permitted to discriminate against same-sex couples who wish to buy a wedding cake. Her comments were made on Loose Women after a Belfast bakery company was successfully sued for refusing to bake a cake in support of same-sex marriage. Following the show, some viewers took to Twitter and called for ITV to dismiss Nolan for making the comments.

In August 2018, she and fellow Loose Women panellists Linda Nolan, Janet Street-Porter and Linda Robson caused controversy due to their actions in an on-air argument with guest Kim Woodburn which led to Woodburn walking off set crying after the topic of her child abuse arose. Woodburn and Nolan had an onscreen history of a sour relationship due to comments and claims made from both parties in the Celebrity Big Brother house in 2017. Woodburn had been invited to come on the show to reconcile with Nolan, but later claimed her attendance was due to the money offered. The row led to over 8,000 complaints to Ofcom, with the majority accusing Nolan and her fellow panellists of 'bullying Woodburn'. Some of Woodburn's supporters even set up a campaign to have Nolan removed from the Loose Women panel completely. She apologised on This Morning in September 2018 and confirmed that she had taken a break from Loose Women and that she had also postponed her 'Never Too Late' solo concert tour. She returned to Loose Women in December 2018.

Filmography

Bibliography

Biography
Upfront and Personal: The Autobiography (Pan, 2009) 
Mum to Mum: Happy Memories and Honest Advice, From a Real Mum (Sidgwick & Jackson, 2010) 
No Regrets (Penguin, 2014) 
Live, Laugh, Love. Lessons I’ve Learnt.  (Constable Books, 2021)

Novels
Envy (Pan, 2010) 
Denial (Pan, 2011)

General non-fiction
 Coleen Nolan's Beauty Secrets: From Drab to Fab in 15 Minutes' (Sidgwick & Jackson, 2010)

References

External links
 
 
 

1965 births
Living people
21st-century English novelists
English autobiographers
English women singers
English people of Irish descent
English television presenters
English women novelists
Musicians from Blackpool
Television personalities from Lancashire
21st-century English women writers
English women non-fiction writers
Women autobiographers
People from Blackpool